Events from the year 1950 in Belgium

Incumbents
Monarch: Leopold III
Prince Charles as regent (to July 20)
Prince Baudouin as regent (from August 11)
Prime Minister: 
 Gaston Eyskens (to 8 June)
 Jean Duvieusart (8 June to 16 August)
 Joseph Pholien (from 16 August)

Events
 12 March – Royal Question brought to a head with Belgian monarchy referendum
 4 June – 1950 Belgian general election

Publications
 Guido Gezelle and Karel van de Woestijne, Lyra Belgica I: Two Flemish Poets in English Translation, translated by Clark and Frances Stillman (New York, Belgian Government Information Center)

Births
 19 February – Frie Leysen, festival director (died 2020)
 23 October – Guy Bleus, artist
 20 November – Véronique Caprasse, politician

Deaths
 12 May – Anna De Weert (born 1867), painter

References

 
Belgium
Years of the 20th century in Belgium
1950s in Belgium
Belgium